Ernest Luther "Bonnie" Bonin (January 13, 1888 – January 3, 1966) was a Major League Baseball right fielder who played with the St. Louis Browns in  and the Buffalo Buffeds in .

Career
Bonin made his professional baseball debut in 1910, playing for the Canton Deubers of the Ohio–Pennsylvania League. He played in 124 games for Canton, finishing with a .281 batting average. He played in the American Association in 1911 with the Columbus Senators.

On April 13, 1913, Bonin made his Major League Baseball debut for the St. Louis Browns, in a game against the Chicago White Sox. He pinch hit, and did not reach base. It was his only major league game of the season, and he returned to the Senators in the American Association for the remainder of the season.

Bonin returned to the majors in 1914, with the Buffalo Buffeds of the Federal League. He played in 20 games, collecting 14 hits in 76 at bats. He batted .184, and played all of his games as a right fielder. He did not play professional baseball after 1914.

References

External links

Retrosheet

1888 births
1966 deaths
Major League Baseball right fielders
Baseball players from Indiana
St. Louis Browns players
Buffalo Buffeds players
Canton Deubers players
Columbus Senators players
Marion Senators players